Universal Publishers may refer to:

 Universal Publishers (Australia)
 Universal Publishers (United States)
 Vivendi Universal Publishing